The Mornar class consisted of two large patrol boats built for the Yugoslav Navy ( – JRM) by the Tito's Shipyard in Kraljevica during the late 1950s and early 1960s. The boats were based on the Udarnik (PBR-581), a French-built Le Fougueux-class submarine chaser acquired in 1956. Both boats had an uneventful career and were deleted  in 1992.

Description and construction 
The Mornar class consisted of just two boats: Mornar (PBR-551) which was laid down in 1957, launched in 1958 and commissioned on  10 September 1959, followed by Borac (PBR-552) which was laid down in 1964 and launched and commissioned in 1965. The class was based on the Udarnik (PBR-581), a French-built submarine chaser of the Le Fougueux-class, which was acquired by Yugoslavia in 1956.

Standard displacement measured  while fully loaded they displaced .

Their original gun armament consisted of two 3"/50 caliber guns, two single-barrelled  guns and two single-barrelled  guns. Anti-submarine weapons consisted of two Mark 6 depth charge (DC) throwers and two Mark 9 DC racks. Both boats were modernized during 1970/73 at the "Sava Kovačević" Naval Repair Yard in Tivat; their 76 mm guns were removed and four five-barrelled Soviet-built RBU-1200 were installed along with a Tamir-11 sonar.

Service history 
The boats enjoyed a long, albeit uneventful, career in the Yugoslav Navy and both were deleted in 1992.

Notes

Footnotes

References 

Ships of the Yugoslav Navy
Patrol boat classes